Diana Meltzer is an American music industry executive. She is the owner of Monster Hits Music and was the co-owner of the world largest independent label Wind-up Records with her ex-husband Alan Meltzer. She is primarily known for discovering and signing Grammy award-winning band Creed, Evanescence, and other bands such as Alter Bridge, Seether, Drowning Pool, Finger Eleven, Beat The System, Company of Thieves, 12 Stones, Thriving Ivory, Bright Eyes, People in Planes, Stereo Fuse She first began her career as a fashion model. Later Meltzer owned a record store in Connecticut in the late 1980s before she was asked to assume the role of an A&R. In 2004 Meltzer became the first woman to top HitQuarters' World Top 100 A&R Chart, a considerable achievement in what is traditionally a male-dominated field. Other #1s have included Clive Davis, Tommy Mottola, Dr. Dre and Mark Williams. Meltzer is still known to be the 'Woman with the Golden Ears'.

History

Early years

Creed

Meltzer and her husband Alan Meltzer made their fortune through CD One Stop before Alan purchased Grass Records in 1997. It was during that time when Alan was looking for an artist Meltzer heard Creed's first album My Own Prison and decided almost immediately that she wanted to sign them to the label. She later said that she heard "an arena band". Within the same week, Meltzer, together with Wind-up president Steve Lerner, and CEO Alan Meltzer flew to Tallahassee to see Creed perform live and decide for certain whether to offer them a contract. "Seeing the energy in the room when Scott Stapp stepped up to the mic, and hearing his powerful voice fill the room, alongside Mark Tremonti’s now legendary guitar riffs and that big Creed anthemic rock sound, was all I needed," she told HitQuarters.

Evanescence

Meltzer first heard Evanescence when producer Pete Matthews played their demos. It was when she heard "My Immortal" that she became interested in signing the band, saying she "knew it was a hit". She told HitQuarters that, although they already exhibited huge talent, they were still young and needed to be developed, and "given the time and opportunity they could deliver a breakthrough sound.

References

External links
 

American music industry executives
Living people
Year of birth missing (living people)